The Taipei Youth Program Association (TYPA) is an independent non-profit foundation located on the campus of Taipei American School.  TYPA serves members of the international community in Taiwan; membership is restricted to holders of non-Republic of China passports.  This restriction is imposed by Taiwanese government regulations on TYPA's charter.

The precursor to TYPA was founded in 1968 as the Taiwan Dependent Youth Activity Corps (TDYAC) by US military personnel.

TYPA provides after school and weekend recreational activities for Taipei's international youth. While most of the youth served are Taipei American School students, participants include children (who hold a non-Taiwanese passport) from local schools, the nearby Japanese and Taipei European School, as well as other international schools in Taipei.

The list of activities TYPA offers is broad, to include: Art and Creativity, Lego Robotics, Dance, Music, Martial Arts, Gymnastics, a pre-school education program, Sports (Basketball, Soccer and Baseball, Tennis), Scouting, Summer camps, and Adult/Health and Fitness programs.

External links
 Official Site

Organizations established in 1968
Youth organizations based in Taiwan